Robin Evan Hugh Jones (born 1 November 1955) is a retired British long-distance runner. He was born in London, and attended Latymer Upper School in Hammersmith, where he began competing in long-distance running both for the school and for Ranelagh Harriers, and the University of Liverpool.

In 1982 Jones became the first Welshman to win the London Marathon, finishing in a time of 2:09:24. Two years later he finished 12th in the men's marathon of the 1984 Summer Olympics in Los Angeles with a time of 2:13:57. In 1983 he finished a close second to Joseph Nzau in the Chicago Marathon. In 1983 Hugh Jones won the Stockholm Marathon with a time of 2:11:37, for twenty years the course record. He won it again in 1992 (2:15:58) was second in 1993 (2:17:29) and seventh in 1994 (2:18:20). His personal best is 2:09:24, set in London 1982.  

Jones became the Secretary of the Association of International Marathons and Distance Races (AIMS) in July 1996, succeeding Andy Galloway. Jones currently holds this position as well as the editorship of AIMS' Distance Running magazine which he started in 2000. Jones was president of the Road Runners Club from 2007 to 2011.

Personal life
Jones lives in London with his wife, Cheryl, his son, Nathan, and his three daughters, Holly, Coral and Ella.

Competition record

References

External links 
 

1955 births
Living people
Athletes from London
English male marathon runners
Olympic athletes of Great Britain
Athletes (track and field) at the 1984 Summer Olympics
World Athletics Championships athletes for Great Britain
London Marathon male winners
People educated at Latymer Upper School
Alumni of the University of Liverpool